Gennaro Cirillo (born September 2, 1961) is an Italian sprint canoer who competed in the mid-1980s. He did not finish in the repechages of the K-4 1000 m event at the 1984 Summer Olympics in Los Angeles.

References

1961 births
Canoeists at the 1984 Summer Olympics
Italian male canoeists
Living people
Olympic canoeists of Italy
20th-century Italian people